Rebecca Yeh is an American pageant titleholder from Brainerd, Minnesota who competed in the Miss America pageant in September 2013.

Yeh was crowned Miss Minnesota 2013 on Saturday, June 22, 2013, in Eden Prairie, Minnesota.  Her talent was violin and her platform was "A Voice for Autism".

A native of Brainerd, MN, she graduated from the University of Minnesota.

References

External links
Miss Minnesota official website
Miss America official website

Living people
People from Brainerd, Minnesota
Miss America 2014 delegates
American beauty pageant winners
Ohio Northern University alumni
Miss America Preliminary Talent winners
American people of Chinese descent
Year of birth missing (living people)